Dufresne is an Italian post-hardcore band hailing from Vicenza.

History 
Dufresne formed in January, 2004 with Nicola "Dominik" Cerantola on lead vocals, Davide Zenorini on drums, Matteo "Ciube" Tabacco on bass and vocals, Luca Dal Lago on guitar and Alessandro Costa on keyboards. The band took its name from Andy Dufresne, the main character from Stephen King's novel, and later film adaption by Frank Darabont, The Shawshank Redemption.

In 2005 the band recorded a twelve-song demo album, completely sung in Italian. Later the band re-recorded six tracks from the demo in English.

In 2006 Dufresne signed with V2 Records and released their debut album Atlantic. To promote the album the band participated at the Taste of Chaos Tour, supporting Underoath in Italy, and then embarked on a European tour, that comprehended France, Germany, Belgium, Netherlands and United Kingdom.

In October, 2007 the band went to Richmond, Virginia to record their second album, titled Lovers, with producer Andreas Magnusson. Lovers was released on April 11, 2008 via V2 Records/Universal Music Group. After the release of Lovers, Dufresne toured Italy supporting headliners Linea 77.

In 2009 Dufresne signed with Wynona Records. On May 14, 2010 the band released their third studio album, AM:PM.

In July 2013 it was announced on their Facebook page that Dufresne went on hiatus.

Members 
 Nicola "Dominik" Cerantola – lead vocals
 Matteo "Ciube" Tabacco – bass and vocals
 Luca Dal Lago – guitar
 Davide Zenorini – drums
 Alessandro Costa – keyboards and synthesizer

Discography 
 Atlantic (V2 Records, 2006)
 Lovers (Universal Music/V2 Records, 2008)
 AM:PM (Wynona Records, 2010)

References

External links 
Official website
Official Facebook page

Italian musical groups
Post-hardcore groups
Alternative metal musical groups
Screamo musical groups
Italian alternative rock groups
Italian hardcore punk groups
Musical groups established in 2004
Italian metalcore musical groups